East Valley School District encompasses approximately  in the City of Spokane Valley and areas of unincorporated Spokane County. The district boundaries extend from Butler Road in Spokane Valley east to the Idaho border, and from the Spokane River north to the foothills of Mount Spokane. The district operates six K-8 elementary schools; one comprehensive high school; an Enrichment Center that offers extensive early-childhood education, alternative education and special education; and a wide array of online learning programs that serve both residents of the area and many beyond. In addition, East Valley co-manages a vocational skills center with adjacent districts.

History and development

East Valley School District was organized in 1886. East Trent School District #63 was the first school district in the Spokane Valley area, it was later developed with the EVSD.

In 1888, the first public school house in the East Valley School District was constructed in the area now known as Otis Orchards. This one-room schoolhouse served the 
areas later known as East Farms, Moab and Otis Orchards. The Little White School on the 
Hill was built with twenty dollars worth of wood donated by William Pringle and was 
officially designate] School District #76 by the territorial legislature. Washington would not 
become a state until one year later in 1889.

The more modern "Cobblestone School" (1909–1918) replaced the Little White School on the Hill and boasted its first graduating high school class in 1914.

A new high school wing was added to the Cobblestone School in 1918. Cobblestone School, known for its tall bell tower, shake siding and field stone trim, was allegedly designed by famous local architect Kirtland Cutter. Cutter's other local designs include the Davenport Hotel and many other historic buildings which still stand in the Spokane area.

In 1923, Stucco High School was built just west of Cobblestone School. When fire destroyed the old Cobblestone Elementary School in 1930, a second stucco building was constructed to house.

With each new building, or as additional smaller school districts combined with the Otis Orchards School District, new school district numbers were assigned. Otis Orchards School District became #314 in 1922 after combination with the Moab School District. E.H. McHenry became their first official superintendent. Borden School District from Canfield Gulch combined with Otis in 1925 creating the new district #341. Schools in Newman Lake, Idlewild and Green Mountain also combined and joined with Otis between 1933 and 1938. In 1943, Otis was renumbered to Otis Orchards School District #348.

In 1957, on a site just west of the old stucco schools, red brick additions of the new Otis Orchards Elementary began. Otis Orchards’ public schools combined with the East Trent School District #63 in 1959 forming the new East Valley School District #361,

Otis Orchards’ old stucco school buildings were used to house high school students until the 
new Trentwood-area East Valley High School could be completed.

The original East Valley High School opened its doors in the fall of 1960.

Harold Hoffman, superintendent of Otis Orchards Public Schools, was retained as the first superintendent of the new East Valley School District #361.

Schools
 High Schools
East Valley High School
 Middle Schools
 East Valley Middle School
 Elementary Schools
 East Farms Elementary
 Otis Orchards Elementary
 Trent Elementary
 Trentwood Elementary
 Choice School
 Continuous Curriculum School (CCS)
 Washington Academy Arts and Technology

Former schools
 Mountain View Middle school - Closed in 2011
 Skyview Elementary School - Closed in 2011 with the building given to CCS

References

External links
 
 District Statistics - Staff, Students, Schools

East Valley School District
School districts in Washington (state)
School districts established in 1888
1888 establishments in Washington Territory
Public school districts in Spokane County, Washington
Education in Spokane, Washington